
 
Gmina Brojce is a rural gmina (administrative district) in Gryfice County, West Pomeranian Voivodeship, in north-western Poland.

Villages 
Gmina Brojce contains the villages and settlements of Bielikowo, Brojce, Cieszyce, Dargosław, Darżewo, Grąd, Kiełpino, Łatno, Mołstówko, Mołstowo, Pruszcz, Przybiernowo, Raciborów, Smokęcino, Stołąż, Strzykocin, Tąpadły, Uniestowo and Żukowo.

Neighbouring gminas 
Gmina Brojce is bordered by the gminas of Gryfice, Płoty, Rymań, Siemyśl and Trzebiatów.

References 
Polish official population figures 2006

Brojce
Gryfice County